Allan James Evans, (born 12 October 1956) is a Scottish former footballer who played for Dunfermline Athletic (1973–77), Aston Villa (1977–89), Leicester City (1989–90) and Darlington (1990–91).

Playing career

Evans began his senior career as a forward, at his home town club, Dunfermline Athletic. His career peaked at Aston Villa, where he formed a pivotal centre back partnership with Ken McNaught. They won the English league title in 1980–81 and was part of Villa's 1982 European Cup winning team. They also beat Barcelona over two legs to win the Super Cup in the following season. Evans later became Villa club captain and helped them win promotion back to the First Division in 1988.

He finished his playing career with short, uneventful spells at Leicester City, Victoria Vistas, and Darlington before retiring in 1991.

Evans won four caps for Scotland, all in 1982, and was a member of their 1982 World Cup squad.

Coaching
Evans returned to Aston Villa as assistant manager in 1995.

Evans also managed Torpoint Athletic F.C. where he invited Aston Villa to Torpoint's home ground during the pre-season of 1995/96.

Evans also managed Saltash United.

On 19 May 2007, Evans was appointed as a youth team coach at Plymouth Argyle F.C.

Evans is the first team coach of Truro College's Football Development Programme.

Honours 
Aston Villa
 Football League First Division: 1980–81
 FA Charity Shield: 1981 (shared) 
 European Cup: 1981–82
 European Super Cup: 1982

References

External links
Allan Evans at Sporting-heroes.net

1956 births
Living people
Scottish footballers
Scotland international footballers
Aston Villa F.C. players
Dunfermline Athletic F.C. players
Leicester City F.C. players
Leicester City F.C. non-playing staff
Greenock Morton F.C. managers
Greenock Morton F.C. non-playing staff
Darlington F.C. players
1982 FIFA World Cup players
Scottish football managers
English Football League players
Aston Villa F.C. non-playing staff
Plymouth Argyle F.C. non-playing staff
Scottish Football League managers
Association football central defenders
Victoria Vistas players
Canadian Soccer League (1987–1992) players